Three Sisters, Three Queens is a historical novel by British author Philippa Gregory, published on 9 August 2016. It tells the stories of Margaret Tudor, Mary Tudor and Catherine of Aragon, three sisters (one of whom was an in-law), who became the queens of Scotland, France, and England, respectively.

References

External links 
  

2015 British novels
Novels by Philippa Gregory
Novels set in Tudor England
Cultural depictions of Catherine of Aragon
Simon & Schuster books